Tuerta pastocyana is a moth of the family Noctuidae. It is found in Somalia.

References

Endemic fauna of Somalia
Moths described in 1940
Agaristinae
Fauna of Somalia
Moths of Africa